"Woke Up This Morning" is a song by British band Alabama 3 from their 1997 album Exile on Coldharbour Lane. 

"Woke Up This Morning" may also refer to:

 "Woke Up This Morning" (With My Mind Stayed On Freedom), a 1960s folk song
 "Woke Up This Morning and Found Myself Dead", a song recorded by Jimi Hendrix and unofficially released on the album Bleeding Heart, 1994
 "Woke Up This Morning", a song by Nickelback from the album Silver Side Up, 2001
 Woke Up This Morning: The Definitive Oral History of The Sopranos, a book by Michael Imperioli and Steve Schirripa based on their podcast Talking Sopranos